Goffredo Lombardo (15 May 1920 – 2 February 2005) was an Italian film producer. He was the son of the producer Gustavo Lombardo and took over control of the company Titanus after his father's death in 1951.

Selected filmography
 Chains (1949)
 Torment (1950)
 Nobody's Children (1951)
 Who is Without Sin (1952)
 Woman of the Red Sea (1953)
 The White Angel (1955)
 The Naked Maja (1958)
 The Angel Wore Red (1960)
 Rocco and His Brothers (1960)
 The Four Days of Naples (1962)
 Sodom and Gomorrah (1962)
 Mandrin (1962)
 Family Diary (1962)
 The Leopard (1963)
 The Fiances (1963)

References

External links

1920 births
2005 deaths
Italian film producers
Film people from Naples
Nastro d'Argento winners
David di Donatello Career Award winners
Ciak d'oro winners
Titanus